Fundamentos (Portuguese: Foundations) was a cultural and literary magazine published in São Paulo, Brazil, from 1948 to 1955. The magazine was close to the Brazilian Communist Party.

History and profile
Fundamentos was established in 1948. The founder was Monteiro Lobato. The magazine was the organ of the Brazilian Communist Party and covered cultural and literary articles. The headquarters of the magazine was in São Paulo. Former Brazilian President Fernando Henrique Cardoso joined the editorial council of the magazine in 1952. Fundamentos ceased publication in 1955.

References

1948 establishments in Brazil
1955 disestablishments in Brazil
Communist magazines
Defunct literary magazines
Defunct magazines published in Brazil
Magazines published in Brazil
Magazines established in 1948
Magazines disestablished in 1955
Mass media in São Paulo
Portuguese-language magazines